This is a list of States and Union Territories of India by Bengali speakers at the time of the 2011 Census.

2011 Census

2001 Census

Bengali majority states of India

West Bengal 
According to the provisional results of the 2011 national census, West Bengal is the fourth-most-populous state in India with a population of 91,347,736 (7.55% of India's population). Bengalis, consisting of Bengali Hindus, Bengali Muslims, Bengali Christians and a few Bengali Buddhists, numbering around 78,698,852 comprise about 86.22% of the state population. West Bengal was created as a homeland of Bengali speaking people in 1947 specially for Hindus of Bengal region.

Tripura 
The non-tribal population of Tripura, the mostly Bengali-speaking Hindus and Muslims, constitute more than two-thirds of the state's population. The resident and the migrant Bengali population benefitted from the culture and language of the royal house of Tripura thanks to embracement of Hinduism and adoption of Bengali as the state language by the Maharajahs of Tripura much before Indian independence. After the Partition of India and Tripura's accession to the Dominion of India, thousands of Bengali Hindus from eastern Bengal took refuge in Tripura. The influx of the Bengali Hindus increased during the Bangladesh Liberation War, when of Bengali Hindus were massacred in Bangladesh by the Pakistani occupation army. At present there are around 2.2 million Bengali Hindus in Tripura, making them the largest ethnic group in the state, constituting over 60% of the total population.

Assam
A “language reversion” has been going on among Muslims who once migrated from erstwhile East Bengal. After Partition, the Brahmaputra valley Muslim migrants of East Bengali roots chose to report their language as Assamese. As a result, between 1931 and 1951, the population of Assamese speakers in Assam (excluding Sylhet) rose by a phenomenal 150%. The Partition violence may have played a part in this decision. The apprehension of being persecuted in the newly independent country made the migrants give up language and keep religion. As a mirror image of the quick rise in the Assamese speaking population, during 1931-1951 the population of Bengali speakers fell by as much as 25%. It is conjectured that of late, the Na-Axamiyas (the new Assamese) have been switching back to Bengali. This curious phenomenon was behind the Assam Movement (1979-1985) according to political scientist Myron Weiner. The relative calm of the last few decades since the conclusion of the movement may have given the migrants the confidence to report Bengali. The rise in the share of Bengalis could be due to Na-Axamiyas reverting to Bengali. In 1931, the population of Assamese speakers in the region was 1.74 million- which constituted 31.42% of the total population while by 1951, it turned into 4.55 million, constituting 56.69% of the population. According to 2011 census, Assam has around 31,205,576 people living in the state. Language census report tells that Assam has around 48.38% Assamese and 28.92% Bengali speakers as per 2011 census. But however, Assam is a Bengali plurality state as stated by various estimation and research. As per 2011, Assam has around 34% Muslims, of which around 30% or say 9,361,673 are Bengali Muslims. Bengali Hindus comprise 24% of Assam's population or say roughly numbering 7,501,421 in the state.

Andaman and Nicobar islands
There is also a significant number of Bengali Hindus residing in the Andaman and Nicobar Islands, estimated approximately 100,000 comprising 26%–28% of the population. Bengali is also the most widely spoken language in the Andaman and Nicobar Islands, despite it lacking official status.

Other significant areas

Uttarakhand 
There are large number of Bengali speaking population mainly centered around Udham Singh Nagar district of Uttarakhand. Much of the population reached here as a result of migration during 1970's. The Bengali speakers are primarily engaged in farming and industrial activities.

Kerala 
There is steady migration of Bengali speaking population from Assam and West Bengal towards southern state of Kerala as migrant labourers. As of 2020, Bengali speakers constitute a large proportion of Migrant labourers in Kerala. Most of the Bengali speakers are working as footloose labourers and only a few consider permanent settlement. The major chunk of Bengali speaking populace is concentrated in Ernakulam district.

Chhattisgarh 
In southern Chhattisgarh, especially in Bastar region there is significant Bengali speaking population. Most of these settlers have reached there as a result of Dandakaranya Project following the Partition of India.

References 

B

Bengali language
Bengali language-related lists
Tamil speakers